KTLX (91.3 FM) is a Christian radio station licensed to Columbus, Nebraska.  The station is owned by TLC Educational Corporation.

History
The station began broadcasting in July 1974, and originally broadcast at 91.9 MHz. On October 12, 2011, KTLX was granted a U.S. Federal Communications Commission construction permit to move to 91.3 MHz, increase ERP to 250 watts from 100 watts. A license to cover was issued on June 18, 2013.

References

External links
KTLX's official website

TLX
Radio stations established in 1974
1974 establishments in Nebraska